"Gone Sovereign/Absolute Zero" is a double-single from American rock band Stone Sour, released as the first single from their fourth album House of Gold & Bones – Part 1.

"Absolute Zero"'s reprise is featured on the track "The House of Gold & Bones" from the second part of the album.

Music videos 
In "Absolute Zero", the main character is stuck in some sort of other-worldly realm. Within this realm, two versions of Stone Sour perform the track throughout the area; one colored grey and the other colored gold. The man is presented with a choice, his body getting twisted and warped as he struggles to make a truly impossible decision. Frontman Corey Taylor said:

Track listing

Personnel 
Corey Taylor – lead vocals
Jim Root – lead and rhythm guitar (first and third solo)
Josh Rand – rhythm and lead guitar (second solo)
Johny Chow – bass
Roy Mayorga – drums

Charts

Weekly charts

Year-end charts

Certifications

References 

Stone Sour songs
Song recordings produced by David Bottrill
2012 singles